NGC 1873 (also known as ESO 85-SC54) is an open cluster associated with an emission nebula located in the Dorado constellation within the Large Magellanic Cloud. It was discovered by James Dunlop on September 24, 1826 and rediscovered by John Herschel on January 2, 1837. Its apparent magnitude is 10.4, and its size is 3.50 arc minutes.

NGC 1873 is part of a triple association with NGC 1869 and NGC 1871.

References

Open clusters
Emission nebulae
ESO objects
1873
Astronomical objects discovered in 1826
Dorado (constellation)
Large Magellanic Cloud